Clervie Ngounoue (born July 19, 2006) is an American female tennis player.

Ngounoue has a career-high doubles ranking by the Women's Tennis Association (WTA) of 366, achieved on January 9, 2023. On the ITF Junior Circuit, she has a career-high ranking of 8, achieved on December 12, 2022.

Ngounoue won the 2022 Australian Open girls' doubles event, partnering with Diana Shnaider. At the 2022 US Open, she and Reese Brantmeier received a wildcard into the women's doubles tournament. They beat Alison Van Uytvanck and Rosalie van der Hoek in the first round, before they lost to Nicole Melichar-Martinez and Ellen Perez, in three sets in the second.

ITF Circuit finals

Singles: 2 (2 runner-ups)

Doubles: 6 (1 title, 5 runner-ups)

Junior career

Grand Slam tournament finals

Doubles: 1 (title)

References

External links
 
 

2006 births
Living people
American female tennis players
Tennis players from Washington, D.C.
American people of Cameroonian descent
Grand Slam (tennis) champions in girls' doubles
Australian Open (tennis) junior champions